Saint Kitts and Nevis is an island country in the Leeward Islands, consisting of the islands of Saint Kitts and Nevis. In 1883, St. Kitts, Nevis and Anguilla were united into one  colony. Anguilla formally separated from the union in 1980.

First stamps

The first stamps for Nevis were issued in 1861. The first stamps for Saint Kitts, inscribed Saint Christopher, were issued in 1870 .

General issues

Between 1890 and 1903, stamps of the Leeward Islands were used on the islands.

Saint Kitts and Nevis started issuing stamps in 1903. These were used concurrently with the stamps of the Leeward Islands until July 1, 1956. Starting in 1952, stamps were inscribed St. Christopher Nevis and Anguilla.

On February 27, 1967, St. Christopher–Nevis–Anguilla achieved Associated Statehood . However, Anguilla proclaimed independence from Saint Kitts and Nevis in July of the same year, and began issuing its own stamps.

Stamps inscribed St. Christopher Nevis and Anguilla were issued for Saint Kitts and Nevis until 1980.

Separate issues
On June 23, 1980, separate postal administrations were established, one for Saint Kitts, the other for Nevis and different stamps were produced for each. Saint Kitts and Nevis continue to issue separate stamps after independence from the United Kingdom in 1983.

See also 
 Postage stamps and postal history of the Leeward Islands
 Postage stamps and postal history of Nevis
 Postage stamps and postal history of Anguilla

References

Further reading
 Baldwin, Peter L. A Study of the King George VI Stamps of St. Kitts-Nevis, 1938-1950. Axbridge, Somerset: Murray Payne Ltd., 1997  69p.
 Brookes, Brian. Classic Collections: St. Kitts postal history. Javea (Spain): The British West Indies Study Circle, 2011  34p.
 Saunders, F. R. GEOSIX Newsletter Study Paper No. 3: St. Kitts-Nevis 1938-1952. Southampton: King George VI Collectors Society, 1975? 12p.

Philately of Saint Kitts and Nevis
Saint Kitts and Nevis